Zorkul is a lake in the Pamir Mountains that runs along the border between Afghanistan and Tajikistan.

Geography 

Lake Zorkul extends east to west for about 25 km. The Afghanistan–Tajikistan border runs along the lake from east to west, turning south towards Concord Peak (5,469 m), about 15 km south of the lake. The lake's northern half lies in Tajikistan where it is protected as part of the Zorkul Nature Reserve. Out of the lake, towards the west, flows the Pamir River, tracing the Afghan-Tajik border. It is therefore a source of the Amu Darya or Oxus River.  The Great Pamir extends to the south of the lake.

History 
The lake is on the path of the Silk Road. It was referred to as "Great Dragon Pool" in Chinese historical records.

The lake was once in the territory of the mir of Wakhan, but the lake and river were established as the border between Russia and Afghanistan by agreement between the Russians and the British in 1895.

Although there is a probable reference to the lake in Marco Polo's account, the first European known to have visited the lake was the British naval officer John Wood in 1838.  Sir-i-kol became known to the British as Lake Victoria, after the British queen, although Wood declined to name it so. It was also known as "Lake Victoria in the Pamirs" to distinguish it from the much larger Lake Victoria in Africa.

See also
 Sarikol Range

References 

Lakes of Tajikistan
Lakes of Afghanistan
Afghanistan–Tajikistan border
International lakes of Asia
Gorno-Badakhshan Autonomous Region
Wakhan
Ramsar sites in Tajikistan
Landforms of Badakhshan Province